John F. Ross may refer to:

 John F. Ross Collegiate Vocational Institute, a public secondary school in Guelph, Ontario, Canada
 John F. Ross (author), American historian and author